Emamrud (also Romanized as Emāmrūd) is a village in Kelarestaq-e Gharbi Rural District, in the Central District of Chalus County, Mazandaran Province, Iran. At the 2006 census, its population was 660, in 190 families.

References 

Populated places in Chalus County